Christine may refer to:

People 
 Christine (name), a female given name

Film 
 Christine (1958 film), based on Schnitzler's play Liebelei
 Christine (1983 film), based on King's novel of the same name
 Christine (1987 film), a British television film by Alan Clarke and Arthur Ellis in the anthology series ScreenPlay
 Christine (2016 film), about TV reporter Christine Chubbuck

Music

Albums 
 Christine (soundtrack), from the 1983 film
 Christine (Christine Guldbrandsen album), 2007

Songs 
 "Christine", by Morris Albert, a B-side of "Feelings", 1974
 "Christine" (Siouxsie and the Banshees song), 1980
 "Christine", by the House of Love from The House of Love, 1988
 "Christine", by Orchestral Manoeuvres in the Dark from Liberator, 1993
 "Christine", by Luscious Jackson from Electric Honey, 1999
 "Christine", by Motörhead from Kiss of Death, 2006
 "Christine" (Christine and the Queens song), 2014

Other media 
 Christine (book), 1917, by Elizabeth von Arnim
 Christine (novel), 1983, by Stephen King
 Christine (musical), 1960

Places

United States 
 Christine, California
 Christine, Kentucky
 Christine, North Dakota
 Christine, Texas

Other uses 
 , a German coastal tanker

See also 
 Christene, a given name
 Christinea, a Latin name of Kristinestad